The 1939 Mississippi gubernatorial election took place on November 7, 1939, in order to elect the Governor of Mississippi. Incumbent Democrat Hugh L. White was term-limited, and could not run for reelection to a second term. As was common at the time, the Democratic candidate ran unopposed in the general election so therefore the Democratic primary was the real contest, and winning the primary was considered tantamount to election.

Democratic primary
No candidate received a majority in the Democratic primary, which featured seven contenders, so a runoff was held between the top two candidates. The runoff election was won by former U.S. Representative Paul B. Johnson Sr., who defeated former Governor Martin S. Conner.

Results

Runoff

General election
In the general election, Johnson ran unopposed.

Results

References

1939
gubernatorial
Mississippi
November 1939 events